Perfect Hideout is a 2008 German action film directed by Stephen Manuel and starring Billy Zane, Cristian Solimeno, and Melinda Y. Cohen.

Plot
A loving German couple has big plans. Nick and Celia dream about a better life in another country. However, a Nick's partner from his criminal past is in no hurry to let him go—at least until Nick pays off all the debts. During a gas station robbery, Nick accidentally shoots a young policeman. Now it is really a big problem. Running from the police chase, the young people hide in the nearby posh villa. They take the owner hostage, who seems to be the only chance for them to stay alive and escape from the place of siege. But things get worse when Nick finds bodies of brutally killed people. So who is their hostage: a loving family man or a serial killer?

Cast
 Billy Zane as Victor 
 Cristian Solimeno as Nick 
 Melinda Y. Cohen as Celia 
 Scarlett Sabet as Nadine
 Ken Bones as Roth

References

External links

2008 films
2008 action thriller films
English-language German films
2000s English-language films
2000s German films